The Eclipse Foundation AISBL is an independent, Europe-based not-for-profit corporation that acts as a steward of the Eclipse open source software development community, with legal jurisdiction in the European Union. It is an organization supported by over 350 members, and represents the world's largest sponsored collection of Open Source projects and developers. The Foundation focuses on key services such as intellectual property (IP) management, ecosystem development, and IT infrastructure.

Projects 
The Eclipse Project was originally created by IBM in November 2001 and was supported by a consortium of software vendors. In 2004, the Eclipse Foundation was founded to lead and develop the Eclipse community. It was created to allow a vendor-neutral, open, and transparent community to be established around Eclipse. The Foundation utilizes a hierarchical project structure. Each project stems from a primary parent project and may have sub-projects. The uppermost projects, which do not have a parent project, are called Top Level Projects.

The Eclipse Foundation is considered a "third generation" open-source organization, and is home to Jakarta EE, and over 400 open source projects, including runtimes, tools, and frameworks for a wide range of technology domains such as the internet of things (IoT), cloud and edge computing, automotive, systems engineering, digital ledger technologies, and open processor designs. The Foundation is best known for developing Eclipse IDE, an IDE primarily targeted at developing in Java. The Foundation as a whole is largely centred around Java development, with more than 90% of its codebase written in Java.

As of December 2022, the Eclipse Foundation hosts more than 412 open-source projects. The Foundation also hosts 21 inter-organization Working Groups, including groups devoted to the Eclipse IDE, Internet of Things, and scientific research.

The Eclipse Foundation hosts DemoCamps, Hackathons, and conferences; its flagship event is EclipseCon.

Membership 
There are four types of membership in the Eclipse Foundation: Strategic, Contributing, Associate, and Committer. Each member organization pays annual dues based on its membership level.

Strategic Members are organizations that invest in developers and other resources to further develop the Eclipse technology. Each strategic member has a representative on the Eclipse Foundation Board of Directors. Strategic Members include the European Space Agency, Microsoft, and Oracle. Contributing Members are organizations that participate in the development of the Eclipse ecosystem and offer products and services based on, or with, Eclipse.  Associate Members are non-voting members who can submit requirements, participate in project reviews, and participate in the Annual Meeting of the Membership at Large and scheduled quarterly update meetings. Committer Members are committers who become full members of the Eclipse Foundation. Committers are the core developers of Eclipse projects and can commit changes to project source code. Committer Members have representation on the Board of Directors.

A majority of Foundation members contribute to the Foundation by creating new applications and tools based on previous Eclipse applications, while a third of Foundation members interact with multiple Foundation projects.

References

Further reading

External links 
 Eclipse.org
 Eclipsepedia

Free software project foundations
Non-profit organizations based in Ottawa